is a series of Formula One-based racing video games developed and published by Nichibutsu starting on the PC Engine in 1990.

Games
The following is a list of games released in the series. None of the series was released outside Japan. The initial games did not feature any licensing, with F1 Circus Special - Pole to Win and Super F1 Circus featuring only Team Lotus license, as Nichibutsu was a sponsor of the team at the time; Super F1 Circus Limited was the first in the series with a full FIA/FOCA license. However, the last two games in the series, Super F1 Circus Gaiden and Formula Circus, featured completely fictional teams.

See also
 F-1 Grand Prix (video game series)
 F-1 Spirit
 Satoru Nakajima F-1 Hero GB World Championship '91

External links
F1 Circus series at Jap-Sai

1990 video games
Formula One video games
Hamster Corporation franchises
Nihon Bussan games
Racing video games
Video game franchises
Video games developed in Japan